Jannaschia helgolandensis is a heterotrophic bacterium from the genus of Jannaschia which has been isolated from seawater from the North Sea at Helgoland in Germany.

References

Rhodobacteraceae
Bacteria described in 2003